Alessandro Bega (born 11 January 1991) is an Italian former tennis player. He predominantly plays on the ITF Futures Tour and ATP Challenger Tour.

Bega has a career high ATP singles ranking of world No. 259 achieved on 25 July 2016. He also has a career high ATP doubles ranking of world No. 369 achieved on 8 August 2016.

Bega has reached 34 career singles finals, consisting of 17 wins and 17 losses all coming at the ITF Futures level. Additionally, he has a reached 23 career doubles finals, consisting of 9 wins and 14 losses, all coming at the ITF Futures level.

Bega made his ATP main draw debut at the 2017 Citi Open after advancing through the qualifying rounds by defeating Danny Thomas 7–6(7–3), 6–3 and João Pedro Sorgi 6–4, 6–4. He was defeated in the first round by Tunisia's Malek Jaziri in straight sets 5–7, 5–7. To date, this is the only main draw appearance he has made in either singles or doubles matches.

ATP Challenger and ITF Futures finals

Singles: 34 (17–17)

Doubles: 23 (9–14)

External links
 
 
 

1991 births
Living people
Italian male tennis players
21st-century Italian people